Lukáš Dlouhý and Leander Paes were the defending champions, but lost in the first round to Martin Damm and Filip Polášek 6–7(7–9), 6–3, 6–4.

Bob and Mike Bryan won in the final 7–6(7–5), 7–6(7–4), against Rohan Bopanna and Aisam-ul-Haq Qureshi.

Seeds

Draw

Finals

Top half

Section 1

Section 2

Bottom half

Section 3

Section 4

External links
 Main draw
2010 US Open – Men's draws and results at the International Tennis Federation

Men's Doubles
US Open (tennis) by year – Men's doubles